Jean Baptiste August "Guus" Kessler Jr. (16 June 1888, in The Hague – 5 November 1972, in The Hague) was a Dutch industrialist. Kessler also played tennis for the Netherlands in the 1906 Olympics in Athens, losing his first match to future Olympic champion Max Decugis.

Kessler was born in a very wealthy family from The Hague, the second son of six children. His  father Jean Baptiste August Kessler (1853–1900) was the first director of the Koninklijke Nederlandse Petroleum Maatschappij (Royal Dutch Petroleum Company), now named Royal Dutch Shell. Guus studied engineering at Delft University.

Both Guus and his older brother Geldolph Adriaan Kessler were considered the "crown princes" of the Royal Dutch, but after their father died unexpectedly they had to work under their father's domineering successor, Henri Deterding. Dolf eventually left, at the urging of his fiancé, and helped create and lead the Dutch steel company Hoogovens. Guus, by contrast, seemed to get along better with Deterding. "The brothers were also strong willed but only Guus, the younger son, succeeded in controlling his emotions and avoiding coming into conflict with Deterding, in order to reach his ultimate goal," wrote Joost Junker and Jan Luiten van Zandem in their history of the company. The two brothers, as leading figures in two major Dutch business concerns, at one point formed a joint venture between the Hoogovens and Royal Dutch Shell to combat a threat to the oil business by IG Farben.  Guus, who became a director of Royal Dutch in 1923, was instrumental in leading Shell into the petroleum-based chemicals business.

Guus was the "obvious candidate" to lead Royal Dutch Shell after Deterding was forced out in 1936, but instead he was passed over in favor of a compromise choice. "It must have been a huge disappointment to Kessler to see his life's ambition thwarted with fulfillment so near." He eventually achieved his dream and became director-general of Royal Dutch Shell in the years 1947–1949, retiring at age 60. For the next 12 years, he served as president-commissioner of the company.

Guus and his first wife, Anna Francoise "Ans" Kessler-Stoop (1889–1983), had five daughters and one son. In 1932, they commissioned the noted French Fauvist Raoul Dufy to paint a portrait of the family on their horses, a work that now hangs in the Tate Collection in London. Ans was a noted collector of modern art, advised by her uncle C. Frank Stoop, and donated to the Tate Collection a substantial portfolio that included works by Pablo Picasso, Henri Matisse, Amedeo Modigliani and Edgar Degas. She purchased a Vincent van Gogh painting on paper in 1930 and it was sold at auction for 8.8 million British pounds in 1997 by a family trust.

The marriage of Guus and Ans ended in divorce. He married Thalia "Lia" de Kempenaer (1917–2000) in 1948.

External links
Player profile at SR/Olympic Sports
 KESSLER, Jean Baptiste August Jr. (1888-1972), Biographical Dictionary of the Netherlands
The Kessler Family on Horseback (1932), by Raoul Dufy, in the Tate Collection, London
Van Gogh painting fetches pounds 8.8m in two-minute sale
The Bequest of A.F. Kessler, Tate Collection, London
 Kessler family archives, with letters by Guus Kessler

References and sources

References

Sources
 

1880s births
1972 deaths
20th-century Dutch businesspeople
Businesspeople from The Hague
Chief Executive Officers of Shell plc
Tennis players at the 1906 Intercalated Games
Kessler family
Sportspeople from The Hague